Stuart Fraser may refer to:

 Stuart Fraser (diplomat) (1864–1963), officer of the Foreign and Political Department of the Government of India
 Stuart Fraser (politician) politician in the City of London Corporation
 Stuart Fraser (footballer, born 1978), English football player (Exeter City, Stoke City)
 Stuart Fraser (footballer, born 1980), Scottish football player (Luton Town, Stevenage)

See also
Stewart Fraser (disambiguation)